Jittery Joe's (UCI Code: JIT) was a UCI Continental team consisting of professional and amateur riders that competed primarily in USA Cycling Professional Tour and UCI America Tour road bicycle racing events.

Its sponsor was the American coffehouse chain, Jittery Joe's. In 2006, for the fifth year in a row, the company served as the premier title sponsor of the cycling team, which competed in road bicycle racing events throughout the United States and raced internationally in Australia and South Africa.

2008 Team

Major wins 
2006 – Jittery Joe's-Zero Gravity
 Trent Wilson – 3rd overall, San Dimas Stage Race, Stage Winner Herald Sun Tour
 Jeff Hopkins – 5th overall, USA Crits series (3rd: Sunny King Criterium; 3rd: Walterboro Criterium), 1st 10K Classic
 Peter Hatton – 9th overall, San Dimas Stage Race, 6th Charlotte International
 Austin King – 3rd, Valley of the Sun stage race
 Neil Shirley – Stage winner Cascade Classic
2005 – Jittery Joe's-Kalahari
 Trent Lowe – Best Young Rider Jersey Winner, Tour de Georgia
2004 – Jittery Joe's
 Cesar Grajales Calle – 7th overall and Stage 6 winner, Tour de Georgia
2003 – Jittery Joe's
2002 – Jittery Joe's

External links 
 Jittery Joe's Professional Cycling Team
 Jittery Joe's Team Profile

Cycling teams based in the United States
Cycling teams established in 2002
Cycling teams disestablished in 2008